Willian Souza Arão da Silva (born 12 March 1992) is a Brazilian footballer who plays for Süper Lig club Fenerbahçe, as defensive midfielder and centre back.

Arão started his youth career playing for São Paulo and Corinthians, where he had his first professional experience, although Arão spend most of his following years playing on loan for different Brazilian clubs. Including a very consistent 2015 season with Botafogo winning the 2015 Campeonato Brasileiro Série B.

In 2016 Arão was involved in a very complicated transfer to Flamengo with Botafogo complaining about the way their rivals approached the player. The situation is still to be solved in the Brazilian justice court.

Career

Corinthians
Formed in the São Paulo, Willian was the new reinforcement in midfield of Corinthians in 2011. Featured in the Copa São Paulo de Futebol Júnior in 2011, the player has good quality in the tackle and can exercise its left side.

Portuguesa (loan)
On 6 August 2013 signed with Portuguesa a five month loan deal until the end of the 2013 Campeonato Brasileiro Série A. At the club he played a total of fifteen matches including his first two continental appearances at 2013 Copa Sudamericana.

Chapecoense (loan)
On 9 January 2014 Arão signed with Chapecoense a one year loan deal. At the club he didn't much chances playing only thirteen Campeonato Catarinense and two Campeonato Brasileiro Série A matches, returning to Corinthians after only six months on 27 June 2014.

Atlético Goianiense (loan)
The second half of the 2014 season Arão played on loan at Atlético Goianiense, the transfer occurred on 18 September 2014. Arão played a total of thirteen 2014 Campeonato Brasileiro Série B matches, twelve of those as starter.

Botafogo (loan)
On 10 January 2015, Willian Arão joined Botafogo on loan until the end of 2015 season. At Botafogo Arão had the best season of his career so far playing a total of 58 official matches, including 35 Série B matches scoring 5 goals, culminating with 2015 Série B title. He was one of the team most important players calling the attention of several other Brazilian clubs.

Flamengo
On 1 January 2016, Willian Arão joined Flamengo on a free transfer. He instantly earned a first team spot being selected to the 2016 Bola de Prata.

On 28 December 2016 Arão signed another three-year contract with Flamengo until December 2019. In 2018 Arão lost space in the Flamengo's first team and the Brazilian press speculated a possible transfer. On May Internacional showed interest in signing him on loan, although the transfer didn't happen.

On 24 July 2018 Flamengo and Olympiacos agreed Arão's transfer for a sum of €2.5 million. A few days later, the transfer was canceled, since Arão and Olympiacos could not agree on how his salary would be paid.

With head coach Rogério Ceni, during the 2020 season, Arão started to also play as centre back.

Fenerbahçe
On 14 July 2022, Arão moved abroad for the first time in his career, signing a two-year contract with an option for an additional year with Turkish club Fenerbahçe.

International career
On 19 January 2017 Arão was called up to the Brazil national team for the first time to play a friendly match against Colombia.

Career statistics

Club

International

Honours

Club
Corinthians
FIFA Club World Cup: 2012
Copa Libertadores: 2012
Recopa Sudamericana: 2013
Campeonato Paulista: 2013

Botafogo
Campeonato Brasileiro Série B: 2015

Flamengo
Copa Libertadores: 2019,2022
Campeonato Brasileiro Série A: 2019, 2020
Supercopa do Brasil: 2020, 2021
Recopa Sudamericana: 2020
Campeonato Carioca: 2017, 2019, 2020, 2021
FIFA Club World Cup runner-up: 2019

Individual
Campeonato Carioca Team of the year: 2016
Bola de Prata: 2016, 2019
South American Team of the Year: 2021

References

External links
 Player profile 

Living people
1992 births
Footballers from São Paulo
Brazilian footballers
Brazil international footballers
Campeonato Brasileiro Série A players
Campeonato Brasileiro Série B players
Sport Club Corinthians Paulista players
Associação Portuguesa de Desportos players
Associação Chapecoense de Futebol players
Atlético Clube Goianiense players
Botafogo de Futebol e Regatas players
CR Flamengo footballers
Association football midfielders
Copa Libertadores-winning players